The Women's Ice Hockey Bundesliga (DEBL) is an ice hockey league in Austria. Austria had 652 female players in 2013.

History 
Founded in 1998, the league uses a format of home and away matches. In the 2004–05 season, the best Austrian teams additionally also competed in the international Elite Women's Hockey League (EWHL). From the following season onward, the top teams only played in the EWHL, making the Bundesliga in a sense the second-level league of Austrian Women's ice hockey. As a result, the title of Austrian champion is decided in a separate tournament titled  (National Championship), featuring the three teams that play in the EWHL and the top DEBL team. Exceptions were the 2006–07 and 2007–08 seasons where EWHL clubs were the only competing teams. Since 2008, following the example of the Austrian men's ice hockey league, the DEBL has also featured teams from neighboring countries such as Slovenia, Croatia and Hungary.

2017–18 season 
 Format
The nine teams of the DEBL are assembled into one division. The teams play each other three times a year.

The top DEBL team qualifies for the Staatsmeisterschaft where it meets the three Austrian teams from the EWHL. The tournament uses a home- and away-game format. The two top teams contest the final, using a best-of-three format. The better-placed team has the right to contest the first game in its home ground. The other two teams contest the third-place play-off, also using a best-of-three format.

 Teams

Championship record

[*] – includes one title from affiliate team, EHV Sabres II

DEBL II 
In 2004, due to the increasing number of teams, a second division titled DEBL II was created. There was no match play in this league in the 2007–08 and 2008–09 seasons.

The team that finishes at the bottom of the DEBL league table at the end of the season meets the top team of the DEBL II over a best-of-three series. The winner of that contest then plays in the DEBL during the next season, while the loser is relegated to the second DEBL.

 Teams for 2017–18 season

  DEC Dragons Klagenfurt
  EHC Lustenau
  EHV Sabres II
  Red Angels Innsbruck
  SPG Salzburg/Linz

See also
 Austria women's national ice hockey team
 European Women's Hockey League (EWHL)
 DEC Salzburg Eagles

References

 This article incorporates information from the French and German Wikipedias.

External links
  League website
  Women's ice hockey page on ÖEHV website
  Austria women's ice hockey on www.eishockey.org
  EWHL website
  Austria women's ice hockey pages in hockey365

Ice hockey leagues in Austria
Women's ice hockey leagues in Europe
1998 establishments in Austria
Sports leagues established in 1998
Women's sports leagues in Austria
Hockey